The 1st Mounted Division was a Yeomanry Division of the British Army active during World War I.  It was formed in August 1914 for the home defence of the United Kingdom from four existing mounted brigades of the Territorial Force, each of three regiments of Yeomanry.  The divisional order of battle changed often, as the 1st Line brigades left for service overseas and were replaced by 2nd Line formations. It was converted to the 1st Cyclist Division in July 1916, and was broken up in November 1916 without being involved in active service.  It remained in East Anglia throughout its existence.

An unrelated 1st Mounted Division was formed in July 1916, from the 3rd Mounted Division, lasting until September 1917.  Another incarnation of 1st Mounted Division was created in April 1918 from the Yeomanry Mounted Division, lasting until July 1918.

History

1st Mounted Division
The Mounted Division was formed on 5 August 1914, immediately after the outbreak of World War I, from four existing mounted brigades of the Territorial ForceEastern, 1st South Midland, 2nd South Midland, and Notts. and Derby.  It was assembled in East Anglia with Headquarters at Bury St Edmunds and the brigades at Ipswich, Diss and two at Bury.  The division was to spend its entire existence in East Anglia.

Later in the month, a decision was made to concentrate mounted troops in the Churn area of Berkshire and at the end of August 1914 these were formed into a new 2nd Mounted Division.  The original division was designated as 1st Mounted Division and gained three more 1st Line mounted brigadesSouth Wales, Welsh Border, and North Midlandto replace the 1st South Midland, 2nd South Midland, and Notts. and Derby brigades.

As the 1st Line mounted brigades left for overseas service, they were replaced by 2nd Line formations.  As with other 2nd Line divisionswhich the 1st Mounted Division was in all but namethe division experienced considerable problems with regard to equipment and personnel.  Even as late as July 1915, some Royal Horse Artillery batteries were without guns, wagons or harnesses, machine guns were lacking and few of the men had fired a recruits' course of musketry.

By the beginning of March 1916, the last 1st Line brigades had left and the division was now composed entirely of 2nd Line formations.  On 31 March 1916, the remaining mounted brigades were ordered to be numbered in a single sequence and the division now commanded the 1st, 2nd, 3rd and 4th Mounted Brigades.

1st Cyclist Division
In July 1916 there was a major reorganization of 2nd Line yeomanry units in the United Kingdom.  All but 12 regiments were converted to cyclists: the rest were dismounted, handed over their horses to the remount depots and were issued with bicycles.  The 1st Mounted Division was reorganized as the 1st Cyclist Division, now commanding the 1st, 2nd, 3rd and 4th Cyclist Brigades.  On reorganisation, 2nd Mounted Brigadewith 2/1st Royal 1st Devon, 2/1st Montgomeryshire and 2/1st Fife and Forfar Yeomanrywas posted to the new 1st Mounted Division (3rd Mounted Division redesignated) and remained mounted.  In exchange, the 12th Mounted Brigade (2/1st London) joined as the 4th Cyclist Brigade.

A further reorganization in November 1916 saw the 1st Cyclist Division broken up.  The cyclist brigades were dispersed and the yeomanry regiments were amalgamated in pairs to form Yeomanry Cyclist Regiments in new cyclist brigades.

Other formations
Two other divisions of the British Army were named 1st Mounted Division during World War I.

When the original division was converted to a cyclist division in July 1916, the 3rd Mounted Division was renumbered as the 1st Mounted Division as it was the only remaining mounted division.  It, too, was converted to cyclists as The Cyclist Division on 4 September 1917.

In March 1918, the 1st Indian Cavalry Division was broken up in France.  The British units remained on the Western Front and the Indian elements were sent to Egypt.  By an Egyptian Expeditionary Force GHQ Order of 12 April 1918, the mounted troops of the EEF were reorganised when the Indian Army units arrived in theatre.  On 24 April 1918, the Yeomanry Mounted Division was indianized and its title was changed to 1st Mounted Division.  On 22 July 1918, it was renumbered as the 4th Cavalry Division.

Orders of battle

Commanders
The 1st Mounted Division / 1st Cyclist Division had the following commanders:

See also

 List of British divisions in World War I
 British yeomanry during the First World War
 Second line yeomanry regiments of the British Army

Notes

References

Bibliography

External links
 

1
1
Military units and formations established in 1914
Military units and formations disestablished in 1916
1914 establishments in the United Kingdom